Robert Sanders may refer to:

 Robert Sanders, 1st Baron Bayford (1867–1940), English politician
 Robert Sanders (composer) (1906–1974), American composer
 Robert Sanders (writer) (1727–1783), Scottish hack writer in London
 Robert F. Sanders, American YouTuber, Road Guy Rob
 Robert L. Sanders (born 1961) American politician in Mississippi
 Robert B. Sanderson (1825–1887), American businessman, farmer and politician in Wisconsin